Modine is a surname. Notable people include:

Matthew Modine (born 1959), American film actor
Nola Fairbanks (born 1924 as Nola Jo Modine), American actress
Ruby Modine, American actress and singer, daughter of Matthew
Arthur B. Modine, American entrepreneur in thermal management